Damien Mouchamps (born 20 January 1996) is a Belgian footballer who plays for RFC Liège] in the Belgian First Amateur Division as a forward.

Professional career
Mouchamps made his debut for Eupen in a 4–0 victory over Geel on 11 April 2015. He made his professional debut in a 4–0 loss to R.S.C. Anderlecht on 18 December 2016.

References

External links
 Mouchamps Walfoot Profile
 Mouchamps Maxifoot Profile

Living people
1996 births
People from Verviers
Belgian footballers
K.A.S. Eupen players
RFC Liège players
Belgian Pro League players
Challenger Pro League players
Association football forwards
Footballers from Liège Province